Esther Levitt (1904–1987) was an Israeli activist and community volunteer.

Levitt was born in Metulla. She was the chairman of WIZO Metulla. In 1977, she won the Israel Prize for her special contribution to Israeli society.

See also
Women of Israel

References

Further reading
Esther: A Biography of the Soldiers' Aunt (in Hebrew)

Israel Prize women recipients
Israel Prize for special contribution to society and the State recipients